Baghramyan is a village in the Armavir Province of Armenia. It is named after the Soviet Armenian military commander and Marshal of the Soviet Union Ivan Bagramyan.

References 

Populated places in Armavir Province
Populated places established in 1983
Cities and towns built in the Soviet Union